The 66th Theater Aviation Command is an aviation command of the United States Army National Guard, previously designated as an aviation brigade. It may comprise two aviation brigades (the 185th Aviation Brigade (MS ARNG)  and the 449th Aviation Brigade (NC ARNG)) and the 204th Theater Aviation Operations Group.

The 185th Aviation Brigade comprises the 3-135 Aviation, 1-169 Aviation, 1-171 Aviation, and the 351st Aviation Support Battalion.

The 449th Aviation Brigade includes the 1-126 Aviation and the 1-244 Aviation.

References

External links
The Institute of Heraldry: 66th Aviation Brigade

Aviation Commands of the United States Army